"Ce-ți cântă dragostea" (English: "What does your love sing") is a song recorded by Romanian singer Roxen, digitally released by Global Records on 12 November 2019 as her debut single. It was written by Theea Miculescu, Andreea Moldovan and Roxen, while production was handled by Mihai Alexandru Bogdan and Viky Red. An accompanying music video for "Ce-ți cântă dragostea" was uploaded to YouTube simultaneously with the single's digital release, and was directed by Raluca Netca. Upon release, the song experienced commercial success in Romania, peaking at number one on the Airplay 100 chart.

Background and release
"Ce-ți cântă dragostea" was written by Theea Miculescu, Andreea Moldovan and Roxen, and composed by the aforementioned alongside Mihai Alexandru Bogdan and Viky Red; the latter two produced the song. The track was released for digital download and streaming on 12 November 2019 by Global Records as Roxen's debut single. Additionally, several remixes and a live version were eventually made available.

Music video and promotion
An accompanying music video for "Ce-ți cântă dragostea" was uploaded to Roxen's YouTube channel simultaneously with the song's digital release. It was directed by Raluca Netca, while Alexandru Mureșan was hired as the director of photography, Loops Production provided production and bmabid editing. For promotional purposes, Roxen performed the track live from November 2019 to March 2020 in Romania: at the Global Studios, on Pro FM, on Radio ZU, at La Măruță, and on Virgin Radio.

Credits and personnel
Credits adapted from YouTube.

Technical and songwriting credits
Mihai Alexandru Bogdan – composer, producer
Theea Miculescu – composer, lyricist
Andreea Moldovan – composer, lyricist
Viky Red – composer, producer
Roxen – composer, lyricist

Visual credits
bmabid – editor
Loops Production – production
Alexandru Mureșan – director of photography
Raluca Netca – director

Track listing
Digital download
"Ce-ți cântă dragostea" – 3:13

Digital download (Alternative versions)

"Ce-ți cântă dragostea" (Andrew Maze Remix) – 3:41
"Ce-ți cântă dragostea" (Adrian Funk X OLiX Remix) – 3:05
"Ce-ți cântă dragostea" (Adrian Extended Mix) – 4:03
"Ce-ți cântă dragostea" (Arias Remix) – 3:09
"Ce-ți cântă dragostea" (Live) – 3:48
"Ce-ți cântă dragostea" (Manda Remix) – 4:13
"Ce-ți cântă dragostea" (Manda Extended Mix) – 5:06

Charts

Weekly charts

Year-end charts

Release history

See also
List of Airplay 100 number ones of the 2020s

References

2019 songs
2019 singles
Number-one singles in Romania
Roxen (singer) songs